Gamesley is a residential area within the Borough of High Peak   in Derbyshire, England, west of Glossop and close to the River Etherow which forms the boundary with Tameside in Greater Manchester. Gamesley is a ward of the High Peak Borough Council. It had a population of 2,531 at the 2011 Census.

History

Early
Gamesley is the site of a Roman fort, Ardotalia, renamed "Melandra" in the 19th century by an amateur historian. It was one of a string of forts built along the route from Lincoln (Lindum Colonia) to Chester (Deva). It also lies on the route from Derby (Derventio) via Buxton (Aquae Arnemetiae) to Manchester (Mamucium)
It was built about 108 AD in the reign of the Emperor Trajan and abandoned about 150–155 AD.

Construction of the estate
The original village of Gamesley consisted of rows of cottages inhabited by workers at the local textile mills, and it remained largely undeveloped until the 1960s, when it underwent considerable change.
It was chosen as the location of an overspill estate, built by Manchester City Council. This was in order to rehouse people from decaying inner city areas of Manchester. These housing areas were also built in other towns surrounding Manchester, such as nearby Hattersley on the outskirts of Hyde.

Gamesley staged events in July 2008 to mark the 40th anniversary since it was first built and people from Manchester began moving onto the estate.

Culture and community
The Trans Pennine Trail passes through Gamesley on its way from Southport to Hornsea. Gamesley is on the West section of the Trail, which is well signposted throughout the estate.

A Roman Garden was established in 2006 with the help of the Countryside Agency's 'Doorstep Greens' programme. 
   
The estate is home to  Gamesley Fold Cottage Garden, a well-known garden and house dating back to 1650. The garden has been featured on television and in glossy magazines, and it is open to the public every year under the National Gardens Scheme, as well as private visits.

References

External links

Glossop 
Trans Pennine Trail website featuring Melandra / Gamesley
Roman Britain website on Ardotalia
Every Action Counts website on the Roman Garden
Gamesley Fold Cottage Garden website

Villages in Derbyshire
Towns and villages of the Peak District
Manchester overspill estates
High Peak, Derbyshire